Syngeneic stem cell transplantation is a procedure in which a patient receives blood-forming stem cells (cells from which all blood cells develop) donated by his or her healthy identical twin.

References

 Syngeneic stem cell transplantation entry in the public domain NCI Dictionary of Cancer Terms

Organ transplantation